Scopula internataria is a moth of the family Geometridae. It was described by Francis Walker in 1861. It is found in Angola, the Comoros, the Democratic Republic of the Congo, Ivory Coast, Kenya, Réunion, Madagascar, Malawi, Mozambique, South Africa, Sudan, Tanzania, Uganda and Zambia.

Subspecies
Scopula internataria internataria
Scopula internataria punctistriata (Mabille, 1880) (Réunion, Madagascar)

References

Moths described in 1861
Moths of the Comoros
Moths of Africa
Moths of Madagascar
Moths of Réunion
internataria
Taxa named by Francis Walker (entomologist)